The World Indoor Championships may refer to:

World Athletics Indoor Championships (formerly IAAF World Indoor Championships), biennial track and field competition
UCI Indoor Cycling World Championships, annual track cycling competition
World Indoor Archery Championships, biennial archery competition
World Indoor Bowls Championships, annual lawn bowl competition
World Indoor Lacrosse Championship, quadrennial lacrosse competition

See also
World championship

Indoor sports competitions